This is a list of Guam territorial symbols:

References

symbols